Estoty Mobile Game Studio is a mobile game company based in Riga, Latvia and Vilnius, Lithuania.

History 
Estoty Mobile Game Studio was founded in 2012 in Riga, Latvia by Guntis Pontags and Vasilijs Siņicins. In 2014, a second studio of the company was founded in Vilnius, Lithuania.

In 2018 and 2019, the Latvian Game Awards named Prince of Persia: Escape and Battle Disc as the Best Hyper Casual Game”.

In 2020, the company's games were among the Top 20 games in the Apple App Store and Google Play Store. As of 2020, games created by the Estoty Mobile Game Studio have been downloaded more than 1.5 billion times. In the same year, the action game Johnny Trigger became the "Game of the Year" at the Lithuanian Game Award Ceremony. Johnny Trigger was the most downloaded game in the world in January 2020.

Estoty Mobile Game Studio specializes in creating hyper-casual mobile games. Among its most famous games are Johnny Trigger, 2048, Knife Hit,  Jelly Shift, Prince of Persia: Escape, Pixel Rush.

References 

Mobile game companies
Companies based in Riga